The Lake County Railroad  was a railroad based in Lakeview, Oregon, United States, owned by the Lake County government and operated by various contract operators during its 20-year existence.  The county-owned line running from Lakeview, OR to Alturas, CA is now leased to Nexxt Rail LLC and operated as the Goose Lake Railway LLC since Summer 2017.

Traffic
Lumber 
Perlite
Wood chips

Motive Power

History

The line was originally part of the narrow gauge Nevada–California–Oregon Railway (NCO) and was constructed around 1908.  In 1926 the NCO became an operating subsidiary of the Southern Pacific Railroad (SP).  By 1929 the NCO was entirely operated by the SP.

In March 1985 the SP filed to abandon the line and the abandonment was approved 5 months later.  The county stepped in to save the route, vital to local businesses and the state legislature enacted a law permitting local governments to own railroads outside of the state, and then the Oregon State Lottery agreed to fund up to 85% of the purchase price if the county could find an operator. The county went to work, and the Great Western Railway, an established shortline based out of Colorado, agreed to operate the line on a contract basis. Lake County purchased the line from SP on January 18, 1986, to keep the line open.

The LCR began operations on November 1, 1997, when it took over the  formerly operated by the Great Western Railway of Colorado under contract. The county operated the rail line on precarious financial footing with frequent derailments and grants needed for maintenance funding.

The line was leased in 2005 to the Modoc Northern Railroad.  During the Modoc Northern years, a lot of investment was made in rail infrastructure to shore up the line and try to eliminate the frequent derailments that plagued the route, but train speed was still limited to 10 mph (16 km/h) for most of the line.

Following the Modoc Northern's failure in 2009, Lake County contracted with Frontier Rail, who operated the Lake County line from Lakeview to Alturas, as well as the Union Pacific's line from Alturas to Perez, CA, as the LRY LLC (d.b.a Lake Railway).  Lake County subsequently terminated the lease with Frontier Rail in September 2017 after a lengthy contractual dispute and litigation.  Lake County subsequently contracted with the current operator Neext Rail LLC, who continues to operate the Lake County-owned Lakeview to Alturas line as Goose Lake Railway LLC.  The Alturas to Perez UP-owned line segment reverted to operation by UP at the end of 2019.

References

Trainweb.org LCR Roster

California railroads
Oregon railroads
Spin-offs of the Southern Pacific Transportation Company
Non-operating common carrier freight railroads in the United States
Transportation in Lake County, Oregon
Transportation in Modoc County, California
Alturas, California
1997 establishments in California
1997 establishments in Oregon